A norepinephrine releasing agent (NRA), also known as an adrenergic releasing agent, is a catecholaminergic type of drug that induces the release of norepinephrine (noradrenaline) and epinephrine (adrenaline) from the pre-synaptic neuron into the synapse. This in turn leads to increased extracellular concentrations of norepinephrine and epinephrine therefore an increase in adrenergic neurotransmission.

A closely related type of drug is a norepinephrine reuptake inhibitor (NRI). Another class of drugs that stimulates adrenergic activity is the adrenergic receptor agonist class.

Uses and examples 

NRAs are used for a variety of clinical indications including the following:

 For the treatment of attention deficit hyperactivity disorder (ADHD) — e.g., amphetamine, methamphetamine, pemoline
 As anorectics in the treatment of obesity — e.g., amphetamine, phentermine, benzphetamine, phenmetrazine, aminorex
 As wakefulness-promoting agents in the treatment of narcolepsy — e.g., amphetamine, methamphetamine
 As nasal decongestants — e.g., levomethamphetamine, propylhexedrine, ephedrine, pseudoephedrine, phenylpropanolamine

They are also used as recreational drugs, though this is typically reserved only for those that also induce the release of serotonin and/or dopamine like amphetamine, methamphetamine, MDMA, mephedrone, and 4-methylaminorex, among others.

Cathine and cathinone are NRAs found naturally in Catha edulis. Ephedrine and pseudoephedrine are also found naturally in Ephedra sinica. Both of these plants are used medicinally (and recreationally as well regarding the former). The endogenous trace amines phenethylamine and tyramine are NRAs found in many animals, including humans.

Selective NRAs include ephedrine, pseudoephedrine, phenylpropanolamine, levomethamphetamine, phentermine, and bupropion. These drugs also release dopamine to a much lesser extent, however, and bupropion is also a nicotinic acetylcholine receptor antagonist.

See also 
 Monoamine releasing agent
 Serotonin releasing agent
 Dopamine releasing agent

References

External links

 
TAAR1 agonists
VMAT inhibitors